Paratylotropidia is a genus of spur-throated grasshoppers in the family Acrididae. There are at least three described species in Paratylotropidia.

Species
These three species belong to the genus Paratylotropidia:
 Paratylotropidia beutenmuelleri Morse, 1907 i c g b (Beutenmueller's grasshopper)
 Paratylotropidia brunneri Scudder, 1897 i c g b
 Paratylotropidia morsei Rehn & Rehn, 1943 i c g b
Data sources: i = ITIS, c = Catalogue of Life, g = GBIF, b = Bugguide.net

References

Further reading

 
 

Melanoplinae
Articles created by Qbugbot